Federal Route 129 is a federal road in Kelantan, Malaysia. The road connects Pasir Mas in the north to Tanah Merah in the south.

Features

At most sections, the Federal Route 129 was built under the JKR R5 road standard, with a speed limit of 90 km/h.

List of junctions and towns

References

Malaysian Federal Roads